The following article concerns the performance of Brazil at the 2022 FIFA World Cup.

They reached the quarter-finals, eventually being knocked out by Croatia in penalties shoot-out.

Squad

Group stage

Group G

Brazil vs Serbia

Brazil vs Switzerland

Cameroon vs Brazil

Knockout stage

Brazil vs South Korea

Croatia vs Brazil

References

 
Countries at the 2022 FIFA World Cup